Allied Bank Limited is the fifth largest commercial bank in Pakistan and is a subsidiary of Ibrahim Group. Allied Bank with its registered office in Lahore is one of the largest banks within the country with over 1400+ branches and ATMs. 

It was the first Muslim bank established in Pakistan before independence (1942) with the name of Australasia Bank. It was renamed to Allied Bank of Pakistan, from Australasia Bank Limited in 1974, and Sarhad Bank Ltd, Lahore Commercial Bank Ltd and Pak Bank Ltd were also merged in it.

History
ABL is the first Muslim Bank established on territory that later on became Pakistan. It was established on 3 December 1942, as Australasia Bank at Lahore with capital of 0.12 million by Kashmiri silk trader Khawaja Bashir Baksh.

2005-to-date
In December 2014, the Government of Pakistan sold-off its remaining 11.5 percent stake in ABL for PKR 14.4 billion. The deal was sealed-off at a strike price of Rs. 110 per share for the remaining 131.3 million shares of the government.

Credit rating 
Long Term Credit Rating of Allied Bank Ltd is 30 June 2020, maintained at AAA [Triple A] and Short-Term Credit Rating of the bank is maintained at A1+ [A one plus] by Pakistan Credit Rating Agency (PACRA).

Islamic banking
In September 2018, ABL opened its Shariah-compliant Aitebar Islamic Banking service through its 117 dedicated Islamic banking branches network across 53 major cities of Pakistan.

Awards and recognition
 Islamic Finance Excellence Award to Allied bank Limited by the Government of Punjab, Pakistan in 2017

FinCEN 
Allied Bank was named in FinCEN leak, published by Buzzfeed News and the International Consortium of Investigative Journalists (ICIJ). It had twelve suspicious transactions flagged in the years 2011 and 2012.

See also 
List of largest companies in Pakistan

List of banks
List of banks in Pakistan

References

Banks established in 1942
Banks of Pakistan
1942 establishments in India
Pakistani brands
Companies listed on the Pakistan Stock Exchange
Companies based in Lahore
Formerly government-owned companies of Pakistan